Patrick Caldwell (born February 18, 1994, in Lyme, New Hampshire) is an American cross-country skier and son of Tim Caldwell.  He is an alumnus of Dartmouth College, where he studied geography.

Caldwell competed for the United States at the 2018 Winter Olympics. He is also the cousin of Olympic skier Sophie Caldwell.

He announced his retirement from competitive skiing in November, 2019.

References 

1994 births
American male cross-country skiers
Cross-country skiers at the 2018 Winter Olympics
Olympic cross-country skiers of the United States
Tour de Ski skiers
Dartmouth Big Green skiers
People from Lyme, New Hampshire
Living people
Cross-country skiers at the 2012 Winter Youth Olympics
Youth Olympic bronze medalists for the United States